The Century Girl is a musical comedy revue with music by Victor Herbert and Irving Berlin, and lyrics by Henry Blossom and Berlin.

It opened November 6, 1916, at the Century Theatre on Broadway and ran until April 28, 1917, totaling 200 performances. Rather than having a cohesive plot, the show was a mixture of musical and vaudeville performances.

Production 
Charles Dillingham and Florenz Ziegfeld Jr. produced the show. Staging was by Edward Royce, Leon Errol, and Ned Wayburn, with set design by Joseph Urban. Max Hoffman directed the orchestra.

The show had a runtime of over four hours. On its opening night, the show began at 8:25pm and ended at 12:58am. This was actually an improvement from the show's time prior to its premiere. It had originally been scheduled to open on October 16, but was delayed in order to cut down the show while maintaining the lineup of actors and performers. Cuts continued to be made after the premiere, resulting in several actors, including Marie Dressler, being let go.

Performances included a "Stone Age romance", an Alice in Wonderland musical number, a number featuring animals and hunters, and a skit with actors portraying of Herbert and Berlin.

The Century Girl was the only successful show produced at the Century Theatre (previously the New Theatre). After the show's closure, the theatre was sold and later demolished, being replaced by the Century Apartments.

Cast

Songs 

 Alice in Wonderland
 The Ballet Loose
 The Birth of the Century Girl
 The Century Girl
 The Chicken Walk/That Broadway Chicken Walk/Jungle Ball Finale
 He Likes Their Jukelele
 Humpty Dumpty
 It Takes an Irishman to Make Love
 Kiss Me Again/Kiss Me Once More
 The Music Lesson/Herbert-Berlin Duet
 On The Train of a Wedding Gown
 The Romping Redheads
 The Stone Age
 The Toy Soldiers
 Uncle Sam's Children
 Under the Sea
 When Uncle Sam is Ruler of the Sea
 You Belong to Me

Reception 
The New York Times and critics from other publications reviewed the show positively.

External links 
 The Century Girl at the IBDB

References 

1916 musicals
Broadway musicals
Musicals by Irving Berlin
Works based on Alice in Wonderland